Dream Attic  is a live album by Richard Thompson released in 2010, on Proper Records. While not a studio album, it is Thompson's fourteenth overall full-length album of new original solo material.

Overview

Instead of recording new songs in a studio, Thompson made demo recordings, rehearsed the songs with his band
and then recorded the new material live on a two-week tour of the Western USA in February 2010. Each night's first set presented thirteen new songs, played live, in the sequence they would soon have on the album.

The album was assembled from these live recordings. No studio overdubs were done. Each track on the finished album is an entire, unedited live performance of the song.

Dream Attic was nominated for the Best Contemporary Folk Album award in the 53rd Annual Grammy Awards. On its release, Dream Attic entered the British top 20 for album sales, Thompson's first. In the US the album reached #83 on the Billboard 200 chart.

All but two of the tracks were also performed as the first half of a January 2011 Glasgow show that was recorded for the 2011 DVD Live at Celtic Connections.

Track listing
All songs written by Richard Thompson:
 "The Money Shuffle" – 5:57
 "Among The Gorse, Among The Grey " – 3:57
 "Haul Me Up" – 4:51
 "Burning Man" – 5:39
 "Here Comes Geordie" – 3:28
 "Demons In Her Dancing Shoes" – 5:38
 "Crimescene" – 6:58
 "Big Sun Falling In The River" – 5:27
 "Stumble On" – 6:04
 "Sidney Wells" – 7:34
 "A Brother Slips Away" – 4:41
 "Bad Again" – 5:25
 "If Love Whispers Your Name" – 7:36

Proper Records released a "deluxe" edition of this album, with Thompson's acoustic demo recordings
of the same 13 tracks on a second disc.

Personnel 
Musicians
 Richard Thompson – vocals, electric guitar
 Pete Zorn – acoustic guitar, flute, saxophone, mandolin, vocals
 Michael Jerome – drums, vocals
 Taras Prodaniuk – electric bass guitar, vocals
 Joel Zifkin – electric violin, mandolin, vocals

Technical
 Simon Tassano – mixing (at Rumiville Studio, Austin, Texas), FOH engineer and tour manager
 Jim Wilson – mastering (at Airshow Mastering, Boulder, Colorado)
 Tony Brooke – live recording
 Russ Cole – monitor engineer and production manager
 Bobby Eichorn – guitar technician and stage manager

References

2010 albums
Richard Thompson (musician) albums
Proper Records albums